The Fordham Rams men's soccer team is a varsity intercollegiate athletic team of Fordham University in The Bronx, New York, United States. The team is a member of the Atlantic 10 Conference, which is part of the National Collegiate Athletic Association's Division I. Fordham's first men's soccer team was fielded in 1952. The team plays its home games at Coffey Field in The Bronx, New York. The Rams are coached by Carlo Acquista.

Current roster

Seasons 
Fordham University has only kept statistics from the 1985 season onward on file, although the program began in 1952.

Source:

NCAA tournament results 
Fordham has appeared in five NCAA tournaments. Their best performance came in 2017, where they reached the quarterfinals for the first time in program history.

Notable alumni 

  Grant Kerr
  Sal Leanti
  Matt Lewis
  Mark Lugris
  Ryan Meara
  Rashid Nuhu
 Jack Shannon
  John Wolyniec
  Janos Loebe

Rivalries 
Fordham's biggest rivals are St. John's and Manhattan. Fordham's rivalry with St. John's goes back to the 1970s, and their rivalry with Manhattan is known as the Battle of the Bronx.

Honors 
 Tri-State Conference
 Regular Season (3): 1982, 1984, 1985
 Metro Atlantic Athletic Conference
 Tournament (2): 1986, 1987
 Regular Season (3): 1981, 1982, 1986
 Patriot League
 Tournament (1): 1990
 Atlantic-10 Conference
 Tournament (3): 1996, 2014, 2016
 Regular Season (1): 2011

References

External links 
 

 
Men's soccer clubs in New York (state)
1952 establishments in New York City
Association football clubs established in 1952